Oncocephalus is a genus of assassin bugs in the family Reduviidae. There are at least 210 described species in Oncocephalus.

See also
 List of Oncocephalus species

References

Further reading

External links

 

Reduviidae
Articles created by Qbugbot